Thomas Tilden may refer to:

Tom Tilden, fictional character in Under the Dome
Thomas Tilden of Philadelphia Silver and Copper Mining Company

See also
George Thomas Tilden
Tilden family